Heortia iospora is a moth in the family Crambidae. It was described by Edward Meyrick in 1936. It is found in the Democratic Republic of the Congo.

References

Moths described in 1936
Odontiinae
Moths of Africa